Neolethaeus dallasi is a species of dirt-colored seed bug in the family Rhyparochromidae found in eastern Asia, especially Korea.

References

External links

 

Rhyparochromidae